Xuan'en County is a county of southwestern Hubei province, People's Republic of China, bordering Hunan province to the south. It is under the administration of the Enshi Tujia and Miao Autonomous Prefecture.

A remarkable topographic feature found in Xuan'en County is a 290-meter deep karst sinkhole, located near the village of Luoquanyan. According to news reports, the sinkhole, which occupies around 100 mu (6 hectares), has its own unique ecosystem.

Administrative Divisions
Five towns:
Zhushan, Jiaoyuan, Shadaogou, Lijiahe (before 2013 was Lijiahe Township ) Gaoluo (former Gaoluo Township )

Four townships:
Wanzhai Township, Changtanhe Dong Ethnic Township, Xiaoguan Dong Ethnic Township, Chunmuying Township

Climate

References

Counties of Hubei
Enshi Tujia and Miao Autonomous Prefecture